Turtle Creek is a stream in Boone County, West Virginia, in the United States.

Turtle Creek was so named from rock formations in the shape of turtle which occur on the river bed.

See also
Turtle Creek, West Virginia - a small community located beside the creek
List of rivers of West Virginia

References

Rivers of Boone County, West Virginia
Rivers of West Virginia